The Bengal Nagpur Railway class P was a class of four 4-8-2+2-8-4 (“Double Mountain”) Garratt locomotives. It was developed from BNR class N and BNR class NM. The Anuppur-Chirmiri section had a severe curvature and it needed an engine with a trailing bogie. Its boiler was slightly enlarged similar to the NM. Due to its water and coal capacity being less than that of N, it could run on 75 lb/yard rails. It could haul  load up a 1 in 91 gradient.

Technical specifications

Sheds holding Class P Garratt
Bhilai (BIA)

See also

Indian Railways
Rail transport in India#History
Locomotives of India
Rail transport in India

References

Railway locomotives introduced in 1939
Steam locomotives of India
5 ft 6 in gauge locomotives
Beyer, Peacock locomotives
4-8-2+2-8-4 locomotives
Garratt locomotives
Scrapped locomotives